Pusticamica Lake is a freshwater body of the southeastern portion of Eeyou Istchee James Bay (municipality), in Jamésie, in the administrative region of Nord-du-Québec, in the province of Quebec, in Canada.

This body of water extends into the townships of Duplessis, Mountain, Benoit and Ruette. Forestry is the main economic activity of the sector. Recreational tourism activities come second.

The hydrographic slope of Pusticamica Lake is accessible via route 113 which passes on the northwest side, between the lakes Waswanipi and Pusticamica; in addition, this forest road (North-South direction) from Desmaraisville goes south to serve the Wetetnagami River.

The surface of Pusticamica Lake is usually frozen from early November to mid-May, however, safe ice movement is generally from mid-November to mid-April.

Geography

Toponymy
Of Algonquin origin, the term "Pusticamica" means "lake of the mountainous countries". Before the Geographical Survey of Canada named this lake in 1916, it was referred to as "Puskitamika".

The toponym "lac Pusticamica" was made official on December 5, 1968 by the Commission de toponymie du Québec, when it was created.

Notes and references

See also 

Lakes of Nord-du-Québec
Eeyou Istchee James Bay
Nottaway River drainage basin